These are the Billboard magazine Dance/Mix Show Airplay number-one hits of 2021.

See also
2021 in music
List of number-one Billboard Dance/Electronic Songs

References

External links
Dance Airplay Chart (updated weekly)

2021
United States Dance Airplay